Jung Hoon (born August 31, 1985) is a South Korean football player.

Club career statistics

References
Jeonbuk Hyundai Motors website

External links

1985 births
Living people
South Korean footballers
Jeonbuk Hyundai Motors players
Gimcheon Sangmu FC players
Suwon FC players
K League 2 players
K League 1 players
Association football central defenders